Admiral Saeed Mohammad Khan NI(M) SBt (1 October 1935 – 4 December 2022), was a Pakistan Navy officer who served as the Chief of Naval Staff (CNS) of the Pakistan Navy from 9 November 1991 until retiring from his military service on 9 November 1994. After his retirement, he briefly served as the Pakistan Ambassador to the Netherlands, having been appointed by Prime Minister Benazir Bhutto in the 1990s.

Biography

Naval career
Saeed Mohammad Khan was born on 1 October 1935 in Bhopal, British India. His family emigrated to Pakistan following the partition of India in 1947, and settled in Karachi, Pakistan.

Upon his return in 1958, he was promoted as sub-lieutenant in the Navy and served aboard PNS Tariq in gunnery. In the 1960s, he was the commanding officer of PNS Tariq  and participated in the second war with India in 1965 and then in the third war with India in 1971 as an artillery specialist and earned a nickname "Beast of the Sea" by his superiors.

Staff appointments and Chief of naval staff
His career in the Navy progressed well and was the Flag Officer Sea Training of Pakistan Navy from 1980–84 as rear-admiral. In 1984, Vice-Admiral Khan was appointed Commander of Pakistan Fleet (COMPAK) and eventually appointed Vice Chief of Naval Staff (VCNS) under Admiral Yastur-ul-Haq Malik, the Chief of Naval Staff. As VCNS, Vice-Admiral Khan was responsible for the naval warfare exercise and command structure of the Navy. After the death and state funeral of President Zia-ul-Haq, Vice-Admiral Khan supported then-Chief of Army Staff General Mirza Aslam Beg's decision for holding the general elections that saw the electoral victory of Benazir Bhutto and the Pakistan Peoples Party to form the government.

Vice-Admiral Khan was later appointed chairman of Pakistan National Shipping Corporation (PNSC) which he led from 11 November 1988 until 13 December 1990.

Vice-Admiral Khan was promoted to four-star rank on 11 August 1991 by Prime Minister Benazir Bhutto.  However, he was elevated as the Chief of Naval Staff when Admiral Malik left the command to him on 8 November 1991. It was during his stint as naval chief when the Pressler amendment came in effect that ultimately led to the military embargo on Pakistan and Navy lost eight of his surface ships that were to be returned to the United States in the 1990s.

However, he successfully negotiated with Royal Navy's First Sea Lord Julian Oswald who helped him close a deal with the British government to sell the fleet of Type 21 frigates to Pakistan. This eventually resulted in commissioning the s in the 1990s. In an interview with Times Now an Urdu-language political correspondent, he ultimately warned of Indian Navy's expansion into the blue-water navy in order to establish the "Greater India."

In 1994, Admiral Khan is said to have recommended against acquiring the designs and development of the Agosta 90Bravo-class submarines in coordination with France over the British Upholder-class submarine. His recommendations were bypassed by the government and the Agosta 90B-class submarines were acquired and built in successive long years.

Ambassadorship and retirement
On 9 November 1994, Admiral Khan handed over the command to Admiral Mansurul Haq who was tenuring as the chairman of PNSC who was appointed by the Prime Minister Benazir Bhutto. After retirement from his military service, Admiral Saeed Khan was appointed the Pakistan Ambassador to the Netherlands where he tenured for four years before returning to Pakistan.

Khan died on 4 December 2022, at the age of 87.

References

 

1935 births
2022 deaths
People from Bhopal
Muhajir people
Pakistan Military Academy alumni
Pakistani military personnel of the Indo-Pakistani War of 1971
Chiefs of Naval Staff (Pakistan)
Pakistan Navy admirals
Ambassadors of Pakistan to the Netherlands